The 2015 AFC U-19 Women's Championship qualification was a women's under-19 football competition which decided the participating teams of the 2015 AFC U-19 Women's Championship. Players born between 1 January 1996 and 31 December 2000 were eligible to compete in the tournament.

A total of eight teams qualified to play in the final tournament, including South Korea, North Korea, China PR (hosts), and Japan, who qualified directly as the top four finishers of the 2013 AFC U-19 Women's Championship.

The top three teams of the final tournament qualified for the 2016 FIFA U-20 Women's World Cup in Papua New Guinea.

Draw
The draw for the qualifiers was held on 17 June 2014 at the AFC House in Kuala Lumpur. A total of 14 AFC member national teams entered the qualifying stage and were drawn into four groups.
West Zone had 7 entrants from Central Asia, South Asia and West Asia, where they were drawn into one group of four teams and one group of three teams.
East Zone had 7 entrants from ASEAN and East Asia (excluding direct qualifiers South Korea, North Korea, China, and Japan), where they were drawn into one group of four teams and one group of three teams.

The teams were seeded according to their performance in the previous season in 2013.

Notes
1 Non-FIFA member, ineligible for World Cup.

Format
In each group, teams played each other once at a centralised venue. The four group winners qualified for the final tournament.

Tiebreakers
The teams were ranked according to points (3 points for a win, 1 point for a draw, 0 points for a loss). If tied on points, tiebreakers would be applied in the following order:
Greater number of points obtained in the group matches between the teams concerned;
Goal difference resulting from the group matches between the teams concerned;
Greater number of goals scored in the group matches between the teams concerned;
Goal difference in all the group matches;
Greater number of goals scored in all the group matches;
Penalty shoot-out if only two teams are involved and they are both on the field of play;
Fewer score calculated according to the number of yellow and red cards received in the group matches (1 point for a single yellow card, 3 points for a red card as a consequence of two yellow cards, 3 points for a direct red card, 4 points for a yellow card followed by a direct red card);
Drawing of lots.

Groups
The matches were played between 5–9 November 2014 for Groups A, C and D; 7–11 November 2014 for Group B.

Group A
All matches were held in Jordan.
Times listed were UTC+2.

Group B
All matches were initially to be held in Palestine, but were relocated to Sri Lanka.
Times listed were UTC+5:30.

Group C
All matches were held in Vietnam.
Times listed were UTC+7.

Group D
All matches were held in Thailand.
Times listed were UTC+7.

Qualified teams
The following eight teams qualified for the final tournament.

2 Bold indicates champion for that year. Italic indicates host for that year.

Goalscorers
7 goals

 Sunny Franco
 Nilufar Kudratova
 Lê Hoài Lương

4 goals

 Jordan Baker
 Beattie Goad
 Shabnam Behesht
 Nodira Muydinova

3 goals

 Amy Harrison
 Fereshteh Khosravi
 Rasha Al-Khawaled

2 goals

 Alexandra Chidiac
 Emily Condon
 Olivia Price
 Pyari Xaxa
 Fatemeh Rahmati
 Jeeda Al-Naber
 Biện Thị Hằng
 Bùi Thị Trang
 Đoàn Thị Thanh Tâm
 Nguyễn Kim Anh

1 goal

 Larissa Crummer
 Brooke Goodrich
 Princess Ibini-Isei
 Pan Yen-hsin
 Sharon Fung
 Lee Wing Yan
 Dangmei Grace
 Nganbam Sweety Devi
 Zahra Khodabakhshi
 Lana Feras
 Mariam Chehab
 Sitianiwati Binte Rosielin
 Upeksha Aberathna
 Jenjira Bubpha
 Jiraporn Mongkoldee
 Maftuna Shoyimova
 Lê Thị Thùy Trang
 Nguyễn Thanh Huyền

Own goal
 Roseamelya Binte Ros (playing against Australia)

References

External links
, the-AFC.com

Qualification
2015
U-19 Women's Championship qualification
U-19 Women's Championship qualification
2014 in women's association football
2015 in women's association football
2014 in youth association football
2015 in youth association football
November 2014 sports events in Asia